Comrie Castle is a ruined castle about 15 miles north (as the crow flies, rather over 30 by road) of Comrie, Perth and Kinross, Scotland. The castle is located on the River Lyon.

The castle was originally the seat of the Menzies family. Partially destroyed by fire in 1487, the seat of the Menzies family moved to Weem Castle. Rebuilt in the sixteenth century, as a L-plan tower house, the castle was last occupied in 1748 and became ruinous. It is now protected as a scheduled monument.

References

Further reading
Coventry, M. (2008) Castles of the Clans: the strongholds and seats of 750 Scottish families and clans. Musselburgh.
MacGibbon and Ross, D and T. (1887–92) The castellated and domestic architecture of Scotland from the twelfth to the eighteenth centuries, 5v. Edinburgh.
Millar, A H. (1890a) The historical castles and mansions of Scotland: Perthshire and Forfarshire. Paisley.
Perthshire illustrated. (1844) Perthshire illustrated: a series of select views of the picturesque and romantic scenery, palaces, castles and seats, with historical and descriptive illustrations and an account of the royal progress through the county in 1842. London; Edinburgh; Glasgow.

Castles in Perth and Kinross
Ruined castles in Perth and Kinross
Demolished buildings and structures in Scotland
Former castles in Scotland
Scheduled Ancient Monuments in Perth and Kinross